The men's 100 metres event at the 2001 Summer Universiade was held at the Workers Stadium in Beijing, China on 27–28 August.

Medalists

Results

Heats
Wind:Heat 1: +0.8 m/s, Heat 2: +0.4 m/s, Heat 3: 0.0 m/s, Heat 4: +1.2 m/s, Heat 5: +1.3 m/s, Heat 6: 0.0 m/s, Heat 7: +0.2 m/s, Heat 8: +1.1 m/s, Heat 9: +1.8 m/s, Heat 10: 0.0 m/s

Quarterfinals
Wind:Heat 1: -2.1 m/s, Heat 2: -1.0 m/s, Heat 3: -0.8 m/s, Heat 4: ? m/s (N.B. wind assisted)

Semifinals
Wind:Heat 1: +1.5 m/s, Heat 2: -0.7 m/s

Final
Wind: -0.9 m/s

References

Athletics at the 2001 Summer Universiade
2001